Big Mink Lake is a fresh water lake in the St. Lawrence River drainage basin in Hastings Highlands, Hastings County, Ontario, Canada.

Hydrology
Big Mink Lake is a long narrow lake punctuated by several narrows and with a forked north end. Card Bay forms the northwest arm of the fork, and the three narrows from north to south are First Narrows, Red Pine Narrows and Crooked Narrows. The primary inflow is Mink Creek from Upper Mink Lakes at the northeast. There are seven unnamed creeks as secondary inflows: at the northeast, east from Sud Lake, southeast, south, southwest, west, and northwest. The primary outflow, controlled by the Mink Lake Dam, is also Mink Creek, southwest to Moffat Pond, which eventually flows via the York River, Madawaska River and Ottawa River to the St. Lawrence River.

See also
List of lakes in Ontario

References

Lakes of Hastings County